The 69th Academy Awards ceremony, organized by the Academy of Motion Picture Arts and Sciences (AMPAS) took place on March 24, 1997, at the Shrine Auditorium in Los Angeles beginning at 6:00 p.m. PST / 9:00 p.m. EST. During the ceremony, AMPAS presented the Academy Awards (commonly referred to as Oscars) in 24 categories honoring films released in 1996. The ceremony, televised in the United States by ABC, was produced by Gil Cates, and directed by Louis J. Horvitz. Actor Billy Crystal hosted the show for the fifth time. He first presided over the 62nd ceremony held in 1990 and had last hosted the 65th ceremony held in 1993. Three weeks earlier, in a ceremony held at the Regent Beverly Wilshire Hotel in Beverly Hills, California, on March 1, the Academy Awards for Technical Achievement were presented by host Helen Hunt.

The English Patient won nine awards, including Best Picture. Other winners included Fargo with two awards and Breathing Lessons: The Life and Work of Mark O'Brien, Dear Diary, Emma, Evita, The Ghost and the Darkness, Independence Day, Jerry Maguire, Kolya, The Nutty Professor, Quest, Shine, Sling Blade, and When We Were Kings with one.

Winners and nominees 

The nominees for the 69th Academy Awards were announced on February 11, 1997, at the Samuel Goldwyn Theater in Beverly Hills, California, by Arthur Hiller, president of the Academy, and actress Mira Sorvino. The English Patient received the most nominations with twelve; Fargo and Shine came in second with seven apiece.

The winners were announced during the awards ceremony on March 24, 1997. Saul Zaentz became the third person to produce three Best Picture winners, having previously produced One Flew Over the Cuckoo's Nest and Amadeus. He also became the seventh individual to receive an Oscar and the Irving G. Thalberg Memorial Award in the same year. Best Actress winner Frances McDormand was the first person to win for a role in a film directed by his or her spouse. Best Original Musical or Comedy Score winner Rachel Portman became the first female winner for composing a musical score.

Awards 

Winners are listed first, highlighted in boldface, and indicated with a double-dagger.

Academy Honorary Award 
 Michael Kidd

Irving G. Thalberg Award 
 Saul Zaentz

Films with multiple nominations and awards 

The following seventeen films received multiple nominations:

The following two films received multiple awards:

Presenters and performers 
The following individuals, in order of appearance, presented awards or performed musical numbers.

Presenters

Performers

Ceremony information 

After taking a year off, Gil Cates was selected by AMPAS in November 1996 to oversee production of the ceremony for the seventh time. Immediately, he chose actor and comedian Billy Crystal to host the 1997 telecast, stating, "Billy is quick and agile and bright, and he plays the unexpected events of the live telecast like a Stradivarius. He's become the standard against which all other hosting performances are measured." Crystal expressed his excitement on hosting the ceremony for the fifth time joking, "Once Barry Scheck turned it down, I had a feeling they'd come to me." Furthermore, he set up a website with the address www.whyistheshowsolong.com asking the public to send in jokes that would eventually be used during the gala.

As with previous ceremonies he produced, Cates centered the show around a theme. This year, he christened the show with the theme "Togetherness of Moviegoing" commenting, "The thing that's kind of wonderful about movies is that you watch them with other people. The only other areas where you do that, when you think about it, are religion and sports." He concluded by noting that the movie theater is "a wonderful place where you come together to laugh, to cry." In tandem with the theme, actress Winona Ryder presented a montage featuring film clips from Casablanca (1942), Matinee (1993), and A Streetcar Named Desire (1951) depicting audiences inside a movie theater.

Several other people and elements were also involved with the production of the ceremony. Documentary filmmaker Arnold Schwartzman designed the official ceremony poster featuring the titles of the previous 68 Best Picture winners superimposed in the shape of an Oscar statuette. Film composer and musician Bill Conti served as musical director of the ceremony. Choreographer Otis Sallid supervised the "That Thing You Do!" musical number. Michael Flatley and the cast of the musical Lord of the Dance performed a dance number during a montage saluting the art of Film Editors. Pianist David Helfgott, whom Best Actor winner Geoffrey Rush portrayed in the film Shine, played a rendition of "Flight of the Bumblebee" by Nikolai Rimsky-Korsakov during the telecast.

Natalie Cole was initially scheduled to sing the nominated song "I Finally Found Someone" from The Mirror Has Two Faces on the show after its songwriter and original performer Barbra Streisand declined to do so. However, after Cole contracted the flu, she withdrew for her performance duties and was eventually replaced by Celine Dion who also sang "Because You Loved Me" later in the broadcast.

Box office performance of nominees 
At the time of the nominations announcement on February 11, the combined gross of the five Best Picture nominees at the US box office was $209 million, with an average of $41.9 million per film. Jerry Maguire was the highest earner among the Best Picture nominees with $121.5 million in domestic box office receipts. The film was followed by The English Patient ($42.3 million), Shine ($16.1 million), Fargo ($24 million) and finally Secrets & Lies ($5.9 million).

Of the top 50 grossing movies of the year, 37 nominations went to 17 films on the list. Only Jerry Maguire (9th), Primal Fear (27th) and The English Patient (35th) were nominated for directing, acting, screenwriting or Best Picture. The other top 50 box office hits that earned nominations were Independence Day (1st), Twister (2nd), The Rock (4th), The Nutty Professor (7th), The Birdcage (8th), Eraser (13th), The Hunchback of Notre Dame (14th), Star Trek: First Contact (15th), Sleepers (29th), Dragonheart (30th), The Preacher's Wife (32nd), Evita (36th), The Ghost and the Darkness (39th), and Daylight (48th).

Critical response 
The show received a mixed reception from media publications. Some media outlets were more critical of the show. Television critic Joanne Ostrow of The Denver Post commented "Billy Crystal had a smashing first 10 minutes at the Oscars last night," but she later went on to say that inevitable sweep by The English Patient created a dull atmosphere that even sucked the energy out of Crystal's performance. Columnist Brian Lowry wrote in Los Angeles Times, "This year the mystery far outweighed the magic, in a telecast that proved less compelling--indeed, during stretches more downright dull--than recent predecessors." He also quipped that even though Crystal was mildly entertaining, some of his jokes "felt a bit forced and stale." The Star-Ledgers Alan Sepinwall noted, "Crystal was a bundle of energy, but his jokes had less zing than in the past." He also observed that the Film Editing dance number and "That Thing You Do" musical performance were hideously bloated.

Other media outlets received the broadcast more positively. Film critic Carrie Rickey of The Philadelphia Inquirer wrote, "Crystal sparkled as the host of the annual awards at the Shrine Auditorium." She also noted, "The mood of the evening was elegant and gracious." Chicago Tribune columnist Steve Johnson commented, "Billy Crystal returned as host of the Academy Awards on Monday night and proved that even if mainline Hollywood is nearly shut out in the trophy dispensing, one of its representatives can at least make a television broadcast entertaining." Television critic Kinney Littlefield of the Orange County Register quipped, "In his fifth stint as host, Crystal served up the sense of inclusive, insider movie community that had been missing during his three-year absence." In addition, she observed, "For most of the evening, Oscar seemed newly energized, upbeat and full of splashy fun."

Ratings and reception 
The American telecast on ABC drew in an average of 40.08 million people over its length, which was a 9% decrease from the previous year's ceremony. An estimated 73.83 million total viewers watched all or part of the awards. The show also drew lower Nielsen ratings compared to the previous ceremony with 27.49% of households watching over a 46.31 share. In addition, it also drew a lower 18–49 demo rating with a 16.55 rating over a 34.32 share among viewers in that demographic. It was the least watched ceremony in a decade and the lowest rated telecast since the 58th awards gala held in 1986.

In July 1997, the ceremony presentation received seven nominations at the 49th Primetime Emmy Awards. Two months later, the ceremony won one of those nominations for Outstanding Sound Mixing for a Variety or Music Series or Special (Edward J. Greene, Tom Vicari, Robert Douglass).

In Memoriam 
The annual In Memoriam tribute, presented by actress Angela Bassett, honored the following people to the score of Dr. Jekyll and Ms. Hyde (1995):

 Jo Van Fleet
 Tupac Shakur
 Brigitte Helm
 Dorothy Lamour
 Stirling Silliphant – Writer
 Saul Bass – Designer
 Steve Tesich – Writer
 Juliet Prowse
 Murray Spivack – Sound
 Joseph Biroc – Cinematographer
 Howard E. Rollins Jr.
 Jack Weston
 Krzysztof Kieślowski – Director
 Fred Zinnemann – Director
 Ben Johnson
 Gene Nelson
 Edward C. Carfagno – Art Director
 Joanne Dru
 John Alton – Cinematographer
 Greer Garson
 Albert R. 'Cubby' Broccoli
 Lew Ayres
 Pandro S. Berman – Producer
 Sheldon Leonard
 Claudette Colbert
 Marcello Mastroianni

See also 

 List of submissions to the 69th Academy Awards for Best Foreign Language Film

References

Bibliography

External links 
Official websites
 Academy Awards Official website
 The Academy of Motion Picture Arts and Sciences Official website
 Oscar's Channel at YouTube (run by the Academy of Motion Picture Arts and Sciences)

Analysis
 1996 Academy Awards Winners and History Filmsite
 Academy Awards, USA: 1997 Awards Internet Movie Database

Other resources
 

1996 film awards
1997 in American cinema
Academy Awards ceremonies
1997 in Los Angeles
March 1997 events in the United States
Academy
Television shows directed by Louis J. Horvitz